The following location in County Louth lacks monastic connection:* Knock Abbey

Notes

References

See also
List of monastic houses in Ireland

Louth
Monastic houses
Monastic houses
Monastic houses